Avernakø is a Danish island south of Funen. The island covers an area of 6 km2 and has about 100 inhabitants.

Originally, Avernakø was two separate islands, "Korshavn" and "Avernak". In 1937 the two islands were connected by a dam named "Drejet" ("The Turn"), due to its peculiar shape.

Main occupations are agriculture and tourism. Children attend the school at the nearby island Lyø.

Ferry
Ø-Færgen operates a ferry  between Faaborg, Avernakø  and Lyø (crossing time is 30 and 70 minutes respectively).

External links
 Island website (in Danish)
 Short information about the island
 Location of Avernakø
 Avernako harbor website

Islands of Denmark
Geography of Faaborg-Midtfyn Municipality